Begumpet Airport  in Hyderabad, also known as Hyderabad Old Airport, is a civil enclave located in Begumpet. The airport is home to the Rajiv Gandhi Aviation Academy (RGAA), the Telangana State Aviation Academy and the Begumpet Air Force Station of the Indian Air Force. Begumpet Airport used to be the only international airport of Hyderabad, until the opening of Rajiv Gandhi International Airport on 23 March 2008.  After the opening of the new airport, Begumpet Airport ceased all commercial operations, with the final flight to take off being a Singapore Airlines flight at 23:40 on 22 March 2008.

History 

Begumpet Airport was established in 1930 by Mir Osman Ali Khan, the last Nizam of Hyderabad, and Berar with the formation of Hyderabad Aero Club. Initially, it was used by the Nizam of the Hyderabad state as a domestic and international airport for the Nizam's Deccan Airways, one of the premier and the earliest airline in British India. The terminal building was created in 1937. A new terminal building came up on the south side in 1972 and later became the main airport. The older terminal hitherto was referred to as "Old Airport" at Begumpet. The new terminal building consisted of two check-in terminals; Rajiv Gandhi International and NTR National with a common arrival module.

In February 2005, Lufthansa commenced a nonstop flight between Hyderabad and Frankfurt using Airbus A340 aircraft.

At the time of its closure, Begumpet was the 6th busiest airport in India. It had 13 parking bays in operation around the terminal block and five "night parking bays" on the northern side next to the old block, sufficient to handle the A320 and Boeing 737. The airport had limited night landing facilities and only 30% of Andhra Pradesh's international traffic flowed through the airport due to the lack of direct flights.

Begumpet Airport's capacity had reportedly been exceeded in both domestic and international areas due to the rate of growth in passenger traffic, estimated at 45% p.a., the highest among Indian airports. The airport handled 20 000 passengers daily with about 300 aircraft movements of 16 international and 10 domestic airlines. US President Bill Clinton's Air Force One landed and took off from Begumpet during his visit to Hyderabad in early 2000.

Civil aviation airshow 
Begumpet Airport hosts India Aviation, India's first civilian air show. This biennial event, organised by the Ministry of Civil Aviation in collaboration with FICCI, was first held 15–18 October 2008. The second edition, India Aviation 2010, was organised from 37 March 2010. The partner country in the second edition was France, and the focus country for the event was the USA. The event was bigger in magnitude to its predecessor. More than 500 conference delegates and more than 5000 Business visitors attended the event. Parallel events of International Conference on Civil Aviation and CEOs Forum were also organized. The third edition, India Aviation 2012, was organised in Hyderabad from 1418 March 2012.

General aviation and training 
After the closure of Begumpet Airport for commercial flights, it is being used for aviation and flight training purposes by Telangana Aviation Academy, Asia Pacific Flight Training Academy Ltd., and Rajiv Gandhi Aviation Academy. Training flights fly only to the south of the airport because of the northern part of the airport being a prohibited airspace for commercial flights.

Accidents and incidents

On 12 January 1978, an adult male pedestrian was struck and killed by the Boeing 737-2A8 Adv, (registration VT-EFL) operating the flight as it touched down on the runway at Begumpet Airport. Indian Airlines Flight 117 was a scheduled domestic flight from Bombay (now Mumbai) to Hyderabad, India. It was the 504th Boeing 737 built.  The aircraft was powered by two Pratt & Whitney JT8D-17A turbofan engines.  When the aircraft touched down, the flight crew saw a man running across the runway. The aircraft struck the man at high speed and he died while being transported to a hospital. The investigation determined that the man had breached security at Begumpet Airport. VT-EFL did not sustain any damage in the accident and it returned to service with Indian Airlines.

In November 1993, an Indian Airlines plane crash landed at the airport. There were no deaths and the plane had to be written off.

See also
 
 
 Rajiv Gandhi International AirportThe commercial airport currently serving Hyderabad

References

External links 

 Hyderabad Airport at Airports Authority of India web site
 

Airports established in 1930
Airports disestablished in 2008
2008 disestablishments in India
Airports in Telangana
Transport in Hyderabad, India
Buildings and structures in Hyderabad, India
Establishments in Hyderabad State
Defunct airports in India
1930 establishments in British India
20th-century architecture in India